Jason Anderson (born February 17, 1993) is an American professional Motocross and Supercross racer #21. He has competed in the AMA Motocross Championships and Supercross championships since 2011. Nicknamed "El Hombre", he is the 2018 AMA Supercross and FIM World Champion, the 21st winner of the Supercross title.

Anderson currently competes with Monster Energy Kawasaki. Anderson competed for Rockstar for most of his professional racing career, only signing with Kawasaki in October of 2021. With Rockstar, he raced on Suzuki, KTM, and finally Husqvarna bikes. 

He trained with Supercross Champion Ryan Dungey for three seasons as well as Marvin Musquin, Cooper Webb, Adam Cianciarulo and Zach Osborne under the stewardship of professional motocross trainer Aldon Baker. 

Anderson has 5 career 250SX wins and currently, 14 450SX wins along with 20 podium finishes in the 450SX class. He was the 2014 Western Regional 250SX Champion and won the 2018 450 AMA Supercross and FIM World Championship. In 2022, he finished 2nd in 450 SX and 3rd in 450 MX, finally earning his first overall outdoor win at Hangtown.

Personal life
Jason Anderson grew up in New Mexico, the son of Mike and Darla Anderson. He raced dirt bikes from a young age and was accompanied to races by his grandparents, whom he is very close to. He turned pro in 2011, and moved to Florida to train under Aldon Baker in 2014. In 2020, he left the Baker's factory and moved to California. 

As of 2022, Anderson moved back to his home state of New Mexico and trains at his personal track there and in California. He is married to his wife Kenzie (Meads) Anderson, who is popular on TikTok and Instagram. They eloped in Las Vegas in 2021.  Jason can be followed on his popular vlog channel on YouTube, Team Fried, created with friends Matt Rice and Tom Journet.

As of 2023, Jason was excited to reveal that he is to become a father.

Season results

Amateur
Anderson started riding at the age of seven. He has 72 amateur wins and 5 Loretta Lynn's Amateur Championships. He was the 2010 AMA Horizon Award winner for motocross and 450A Class champion at Loretta Lynn's.

2011 season

Jason struggled in his pro 250 rookie season for Rockstar Suzuki. Admittedly not having the fitness required. He raced the east coast with his best finish a 6th.  

His motocross season was also rough, with his best finish an 8th.

2012 season

Anderson had another tough supercross season, but managed to achieve his first podium, a 2nd place, at the Salt Lake City race.  

Jason showed some improvement in his motocross season, placing consistently in the 6th-13th range.

2013 season

Anderson again raced the west coast, and showed promise in his supercross season with 2 podiums and his first pro win, again in Salt Lake City.   

Jason stayed mostly in the top 10 in motocross, until the end of the season, but managed to come away with his first podium, a 3rd at Spring Creek.

2014 season
In Anderson's 4th year in the 250 class, he began training with Aldon Baker and the Rockstar team switched to KTM bikes. For this season, Anderson raced with the number 17. 

Anderson came out firing as he won the opener in Anaheim. He and Cole Seely battled for the championship in the 250 SX-West. Jason persevered throughout the season, often stealing victories on the final lap, and locked down the championship in his final year in the 250 cc class with 4 wins and 3 podiums. 

Jason struggled with small injuries and illness during his motocross season, but stayed mostly in the top 10, with 3 podiums. 

After the outdoor season, Anderson's team switched bikes to Husqvarna. Jason raced in the Monster Energy Cup on a 450, placing  7th.

2015 season

Anderson went back to the number 21 this year, and instead of defending his 250 supercross title, moved into the 450 class. He came out strong in his rookie season with a 2nd in Anaheim. He stayed mostly within the top 10, finishing 7th overall in supercross standings with 2 podiums.   

Jason had a good 450 rookie motocross season, finishing 6th overall with 4 podiums.  

He placed 3rd in the Monster Energy Cup.

2016 season
Anderson was very consistent in his sophomore 450 supercross season, rarely placing outside the top 5. He finished 3rd overall, winning both the season opener in Anaheim, in a strong come from behind victory, and the 11th round in Detroit. He made the podium 5 times. 

Jason had a decent motocross season started, making the podium once; but after 5 races, a broken collarbone ended his season.  

After healing up, Anderson was chosen as a member of Team USA, along with Cooper Webb and Alex Martin, for the 2016 Motocross des Nations in Maggiora, Italy.  During a practice crash, he fractured his foot, but decided to race. After a battle with Jeffrey Herlings, he won the second race, putting team USA into the lead for the title. However, while celebrating his victory, Jason rolled the finish line jump and was then landed on by a lapped rider. He was knocked unconscious and broke a shoulder blade, making him unable to compete in the third moto. France took the team win. and USA finished 3rd.

2017 season
Jason Anderson had a solid supercross season, consistently in the top 5 with 6 podiums. He finished with a win at the last race in Las Vegas, securing him 4th overall in the season.

During the outdoor Motocross championship, Jason came out swinging with a streak of 5 consecutive podiums before crashes sidelined him for several races. He then had surgery to remove a plate from his foot, which kept him out for the remainder of the season.  

Jason did well in the Monster Energy Cup, but finished 2nd, behind Marvin Musquin.

2018 season
During the 2018 Supercross championship, Anderson came out strong with a 2nd at Anaheim 1, then won in Houston, gaining the red plate. His points lead eventually grew to 41, aided by injuries sustained by main title contenders Eli Tomac, Marvin Musquin and Ken Roczen. He then took firsts in Oakland, San Diego, and Atlanta, podiumed 11 times and was 4th or better in 14 of the 17 season races. His once-comfortable lead was drastically cut short during round 16 in Salt Lake City due to a crash which broke several spokes on his front wheel. After a pit stop for a new wheel, he was only able to get up to 17th. With the points lead reduced to 14, the championship was decided at the closing round in Las Vegas' Sam Boyd Stadium. Anderson placed fifth, winning the championship 9 points over Marvin Musquin.

Jason raced 4 rounds of motocross and had 1 podium, though practice injuries removed him from most of the season.   

He again placed 2nd in the Monster Energy Cup.  

He also raced in the Australian supercross open and won.

2019 season
Anderson only raced 3 rounds of supercross, gaining 1 podium, before he broke his arm in two places and suffered a broken rib in a practice crash.  

Anderson was able to complete a full motocross season, staying mostly in the top 5 and gaining 4 podiums in a strong showing. He placed 4th overall.  

Jason was chosen again for the team USA for MXoN in Assen, along with Zach Osborne and Justin Cooper. Jason went to Europe a month early with his team and Team Fried friends to train. After challenging weather and track conditions, including Justin Cooper going down and taking Anderson with him, Team USA finished 6th.  

Jason again competed in the Australian Supercross open in Melbourne and Auckland taking a 1st and 2nd.

2020 season

Anderson had a decent supercross season, staying mostly in the top 5. He placed 4th overall after the Covid-forced residency in Salt Lake City. During this time, he announced he was parting ways with long- time trainer Aldon Baker, saying he needed a change of pace in training.  

He competed in 3 rounds of motocross, with one podium, before having severe pain in his arm caused by a surgical plate from breaking his arm previously. After having surgery to remove the plate, he was out for the remainder of the season.

2021 season

Anderson had a tough supercross season, finishing 8th with 2 podiums. 

He only completed one motocross race before breaking his hand in practice accident which ended his season. 

In the fall, he announced he had signed with the Monster Energy Kawasaki team, which is the manufacturer he raced for during his amateur career.

2022 Season 
Anderson began the year on a Kawasaki with his new team. He started his supercross season with a 10th place finish in Anaheim, but won the next race in Oakland, ending a 47 race winless streak. He then picked up wins in Anaheim (Round 6), Minneapolis (Round 7), Atlanta (Round 14), Foxborough (Round 15), Denver (Round 16). and Salt Lake City (round 17). Jason ended the supercross season with 7 wins, doubling his previous number of wins, and putting him on the all-time supercross win list at 18th with 14 wins. Jason was involved in many on track incidents which cost him points, however, at the closest, he was only 3 points away from Champion, Eli Tomac. Anderson finished a close 2nd overall. 

Anderson started his motocross season out strong, gaining his first ever outdoor overall win at Hangtown. After a solid string of podium finishes behind front runners Eli Tomac and Chase Sexton, Jason pulled out another overall win at Budds Creek. He was able to complete his outdoor season without injury and ended up 3rd overall in his best motocross season. 

2023 Season 

Anderson's 2023 Supercross season has started slowly. He's currently gained 1 podium.

AMA Supercross results

References

Living people
1993 births
American motocross riders
Sportspeople from New Mexico
People from Edgewood, New Mexico